Martell De-Angelo Taylor-Crossdale (born 26 December 1999) is an English professional footballer who plays as a striker for Metropolitan Police.

Career
Taylor-Crossdale began his youth career with Chelsea but left the club following the expiration of his contract in the summer of 2019, signing a two-year deal with Fulham instead. He had turned down a move to Bundesliga side Hoffenheim to join Fulham, despite travelling to Germany to complete a medical with the side.

On 4 September 2020, Taylor-Crossdale joined League Two side Colchester United on a season-long loan deal. He made his debut for Colchester as a second-half substitute during their 2–0 EFL Trophy defeat to Portsmouth on 8 September.
But on 18 October 2020, Taylor-Crossdale returned to his parent club Fulham after he left Colchester United via mutual consent.

In February 2021, Taylor-Crossdale joined EFL Championship side Queens Park Rangers on a trial period. He scored the only goal in a 1-0 U23 match against Ipswich Town on 23rd February 2021. 

After trials at Queens Park Rangers and Doncaster Rovers, Taylor-Crossdale joined National League side Weymouth in October 2021.

After a short spell at Gloucester City, he joined Hendon on 26 November 2022. Less than a month later, on 11 December, he moved to Metropolitan Police.

Career statistics

Notes

References

1999 births
Living people
English footballers
Footballers from Edmonton, London
Association football forwards
Chelsea F.C. players
Fulham F.C. players
Colchester United F.C. players
Weymouth F.C. players
Gloucester City A.F.C. players
Hendon F.C. players
Metropolitan Police F.C. players
National League (English football) players